James Kanter is an American and British journalist based in Brussels.

Kanter helped establish the first independent newspaper in Cambodia after the fall of the  Khmer Rouge rule, The Cambodia Daily, where he served as editor in chief from 1995 to 1997.

Kanter was the correspondent for the International Herald Tribune and The New York Times in Brussels for 12 years until leaving the paper in 2017 to launch EU Scream in 2018, a podcast on European affairs.

According to the news website EURACTIV and the consulting firm ZN Consulting, Kanter counts among the most influential people in the Brussels bubble.

Education

Kanter earned a bachelor's degree from Columbia University. He holds master's degrees from Yale Law School and from City, University of London.

European politics

As the correspondent of The New York Times in Brussels, Kanter questioned some aspects of the functioning of the European institutions, such as power dynamics at the EU summits. He also made skeptical comments of the functioning of the Belgian parliamentary system.

Kanter warned that "too many people working for the EU institutions don't see the big picture" in reference to the threats to the European project that the nationalist and nativist forces in Europe represent. 

He reported on antitrust issues from the perspective of American companies. 
 
In 2018, after leaving The New York Times, Kanter launched the podcast EU Scream focused on civil society issues in the EU.

UK citizens rights in the Brexit context
Kanter expressed concerns early on about the Brexit referendum and about what it would mean for UK citizens.
After the Brexit referendum of 2016, he became an advocate for British citizens seeking to obtain an EU passport in another country in order to preserve their rights.

Awards
In 2009 Kanter won the UACES/Thomson Reuters Reporting Europe prize.
Kanter was awarded the prize for his reporting on the European Union Emissions Trading System.

External links
James Kanter at The New York Times

References

British investigative journalists
American investigative journalists
 The New York Times writers
1967 births
Living people
Columbia University alumni
Alumni of City, University of London
Yale Law School alumni
International Herald Tribune people
UACES award